Jahanara Arzu (born 17 November 1932) is a Bangladeshi poet. She was awarded Ekushey Padak in 1987 by the Government of Bangladesh for her contribution to Bengali literature. Arzu and Sufia Kamal were the founding editors of Sultana, the first women's weekly published from East Bengal on January 14, 1949.

Personal life
Arzu was married to a former Vice President of Bangladesh and Justice A K M Nurul Islam. Together they have two sons including Justice Md Ashfaqul Islam and professor Minara Zahan.

References

Living people
Bangladeshi women poets
Bangladeshi women writers
Bangladeshi writers
Recipients of the Ekushey Padak
Writers from Dhaka
1932 births
20th-century Bengalis